Lefrançois or LeFrançois is a surname of French origin. Notable people with the surname include:

Anne-Marie LeFrançois (born 1977), Canadian skier
Cathy LeFrançois (born 1971), Canadian professional bodybuilder
Charles Lefrançois (born 1972), Canadian Olympic high jumper
J.-Eugène Lefrançois (1896–1979), Québécois industrialist and politician
Laurent Lefrançois (born 1974), French composer
Marc LeFrançois (born 1939), Canadian business executive; former president and CEO of Via Rail Canada
Nicolas Lefrançois (1794–1866), Canadian surveyor
Nicolas Lefrançois (cyclist) (born 1987), French cyclist
Roselyne Lefrançois (born 1950), French politician
Sabrina Lefrançois (born 1980), French Olympic figure skater

See also
Gustave Lefrançais (1826–1901), French revolutionary

French-language surnames